Magnes is the fifth solo album released by Reni Jusis. This dance album contains six original songs, one cover song (Ocale Cie by 2 Plus 1), three English-language versions of her older songs ("Single Bite Lover", "Leniviec", "How Can I Ever Forget You") and remixes of the first singles. The first ten tracks segue into each other, like a continuous club set.

Track listing
 Magnes
 Ocale Cie
 Ginger Girl
 Mixtura
 Go Spinning
 Kilka Prostych Prawd
 Single Bite Lover
 Leniviec
 How Can I Ever Forget You
 Niemy krzyk
 Magnes [Tundra & Tayga Latin House Mix]
 Kilka Prostych Prawd [Extended Version]

Singles 

 Kilka Prostych Prawd (pop version, which on album is named Extended Version)
 Magnes
 Mixtura
 Niemy krzyk

2006 albums
Reni Jusis albums